Waldkirchen am Wesen is a municipality in the district of Schärding in the Austrian state of Upper Austria.

Geography
Waldkirchen lies in the Innviertel. About 34 percent of the municipality is forest, and 53 percent is farmland.

References

Cities and towns in Schärding District